Ziyang railway station is a railway station of Chengdu–Chongqing Railway. The station is located in Yanjiang District, Ziyang, Sichuan, China.

See also 
 Ziyang North railway station

References 

Stations on the Chengdu–Chongqing Railway
Railway stations in Sichuan
Railway stations in China opened in 1953